Minuscule 742 (in the Gregory-Aland numbering), Θε414 (von Soden), is a Greek minuscule manuscript of the New Testament written on paper. Palaeographically it has been assigned to the 15th century. The manuscript has no complex contents. Scrivener labelled it as 764e.

Description 

The codex contains the text of the Gospel of John on 160 paper leaves (size ), with one lacuna (John 21:22-25).

The text is written in one column per page, 26-28 lines per page.

It has a commentary of Theophylact.

Text 

Aland the Greek text of the codex did not place in any Category.

It was not examined by using the Claremont Profile Method.

It lacks the text of the Pericope Adulterae (John 7:53-8:11).

History 

Scrivener dated the manuscript to the 15th or 16th century; Gregory dated it to the 15th century. The manuscript is currently dated by the INTF to the 15th century.

The manuscript was added to the list of New Testament manuscripts by Scrivener (764) and Gregory (742). It was examined and described by Paulin Martin. Gregory saw the manuscript in 1885.

The manuscript is now housed at the Bibliothèque nationale de France (Gr. 1775) in Paris.

See also 

 List of New Testament minuscules
 Biblical manuscript
 Textual criticism
 Minuscule 743

References

Further reading 

 

Greek New Testament minuscules
15th-century biblical manuscripts
Bibliothèque nationale de France collections